Diocese of Killala may refer to:

Roman Catholic Diocese of Killala, a diocese in the west of Ireland
Diocese of Tuam, Killala and Achonry, a Church of Ireland diocese in the west of Ireland

See also
Bishop of Killala
Bishop of Killala and Achonry
Bishop of Tuam, Killala and Achonry